Zlá krev (Evil blood) is a Czechoslovak television historical mini-series which was first broadcast in 1986. The programme was directed by František Filip. The story is based on five books written by Vladimír Neff: "Sňatky z rozumu" (Marriages of convenience), "Císařské fialky" (Imperial violets), "Zlá krev" (Evil blood), "Veselá vdova" (Merry Widow) and "Královský vozataj" (Royal charioteer) – all creating the family saga and loosely telling the story of the ancestors of Neff family through the 19th century.

References

External links 
 CSFD.cz – Zlá krev
 

Czechoslovak television series
1986 Czechoslovak television series debuts
Czech drama television series
1980s Czechoslovak television series
Czechoslovak Television original programming